Azadliq (Azadlıq) in Azerbaijani language means Freedom.

Azadliq (newspaper)
Azadliq (radio station)
Azadliq.az (online newspaper)
Azadliq Square, Baku
Freedom (Azerbaijan)